is a role-playing video game developed by Japanese company Media.Vision. Originally released in Japan in 1996 for the PlayStation, it was later translated and released in North America in 1997 and Europe in 1998 by Sony Computer Entertainment. It features a fantasy setting and motif and 2D computer graphics for normal gameplay, while battle sequences are rendered in 3D.

Taking place in the fantasy world of Filgaia, Wild Arms follows the adventures of a band of miscreants and adventurers called Dream Chasers who scour the world in search of excitement and fortune. The player assumes control of a young boy named Rudy who has the ability to operate powerful weapons called Ancient Relic Machines (ARMs), forbidden remnants of a lost age that resemble firearms. Along with his companions Jack and Cecilia, the group must use their respective skills to navigate through the vast wastelands and dungeons of Filgaia and prevent an otherworldly threat from reviving their lost leader and destroying the world.

Despite its release being somewhat overshadowed by hype for the upcoming Final Fantasy VII, Wild Arms was a critical and commercial success. Since the American branch of Sony Computer Entertainment had only recently lifted its policy against allowing RPGs to be released in the U.S., there were relatively few RPGs available for the system in the U.S. at that time, giving Wild Arms an added advantage in that market. In November 2003, an enhanced remake titled Wild Arms Alter Code: F was released for the PlayStation 2 in Japan, with a North American version produced in 2005. In addition to enhanced graphics, Alter Code: F also features an expanded script, remastered soundtrack, new characters, and additional gameplay scenarios.

Gameplay

Wild Arms is a role-playing video game that involves the player controlling up to three characters, Rudy, Jack, and Cecilia, as they progress through a number of environments, battle enemies, and solve puzzles. The game is presented in a top-down two-dimensional fashion where the player has an overhead view of all the action taking place on a particular screen. To advance, the player must overcome a number of story-based scenarios and sequences that involve navigating through dungeons while fighting enemies that appear randomly. Characters progress and grow by gaining experience points after a battle, discovering crest graphs, finding ARMs, and mastering sword techniques prompted by various events in the game. This allows them to battle increasingly more difficult demonic entities.

Progressively more powerful armor and weapons can be purchased for each character from specialized shops in towns throughout the world, and new skills can be learned to help the player complete tougher challenges. Special devices called "Tools" unique to each character allow the player to traverse otherwise impassable situations while not in battle. These items are obtained at certain points in the game, and allow hidden areas or pathways to be discovered, as well as destroy objects and solve puzzles. Rudy's bomb tool, for example, can demolish large rocks and other impediments, while Jack's grappling hook allows the party to cross large gaps and chasms while avoiding traps.

Battle system
Unlike normal gameplay, where all character and background graphics are two-dimensional (2D), combat is rendered entirely in 3D. Wild Arms uses a turn-based battle system in which the player inputs commands at the start of each round designating which actions take place. The order in which each character and enemy performs these actions is based on their "response" (RES) statistic, which denotes how quickly a particular character can act.  The higher a character's response, the more likely they are to act before an enemy. The player has the option every round to either use a restorative item from their inventory, use a special skill, run from combat, or attack. Enemy units are defeated when their hit points, a numerical representation of their vitality, reaches zero. Hit points can be reduced by attacking an enemy, either with standard attacks or spells.

Each of the three playable characters has a unique set of abilities that can be used to defeat enemies or aid party members. Rudy utilizes "ARMs", powerful yet limited attacks involving gun-like weapons that rely on a set number of bullets, Jack's "Fast Draw" sword techniques can damage opponents in a variety of ways, and Cecilia's magic can either benefit the party by restoring hit points, raising statistics or damage enemies with harmful spells. Additionally, a character can equip special items called "runes" allowing them to summon powerful Guardians to aid them in battle. New skills are acquired as the main story progresses, completing side quests, or purchasing them from an in-game shop (magic).

During combat, each character has a "Force Bar" divided into 4 equal-sized sections called levels. As the bar's level increases, the player is given access to one of four "Force Techniques", made available through different areas of gameplay. These techniques allow a character to perform a special action each time they attack or use a skill, adding to their overall effectiveness. Cecilia's "Mystic" ability, for example, allows an item to be used to cast a spell whether it be an attack, restorative or assist spell, and Jack's "Accelerator" gives him the option of acting first in the next combat round, regardless of his or the enemy's speed. The more effective the skill, the more Force Bar levels the move requires.

Like normal equipment, Runes can alter a character's statistics to make them more proficient in certain areas of combat, such as raising their strength statistic, increasing the damage they cause with normal attacks. Equipping these items has the added benefit of allowing a character to call upon powerful magic creatures to attack all enemies at once or aid allies with beneficial magic. Runes can be obtained either in hidden areas within dungeons, or simply whenever the story wills it. Most Guardian attacks, like Cecilia's magic, have a certain elemental designation that is more effective against certain enemies.

Plot

Setting
Wild Arms takes place in the world of Filgaia ("Fargaia" in the original Japanese version), a fantasy world modeled closely after medieval Europe, though the technology is comparable to that of the early Industrial Revolution, with advancements such as motors first coming into use. Destructive technology such as guns and firearms are seen as dangerous and therefore forbidden technology that is feared by the general populace. Since most of the world's most advanced technology existed centuries before the start of the game, archaeologists and engineers are essentially one and the same; rediscovering old technology as they find new applications for it.

Characters
In addition to several supporting characters and villains, Wild Arms features three playable characters:
Rudy Roughnight (ロディ・ラグナイト Rodi Ragunaito "Rody Roughnight"in the Japanese version and "Rudy Roughknight" in subsequent English translations) is a 15-year-old boy from a remote village who was orphaned several years before the beginning of the game when his grandfather died. Under the care of the town's mayor, Rudy worked as a farmhand for his neighbor. Rudy finds and rescues a local boy lost in a cave just outside town, yet inadvertently frees a zombie sealed within the cavern. He defeats the zombie and saves the village, but alerts the villagers to his forbidden ARM weapon in the process, causing him to be cast out of the village, returning to the life of an adventurer and drifter. After severing his own arm (by sword in Wild Arms, and by gun in Wild Arms Alter Code: F), Rudy is discovered to be a Holmcross, an artificial being designed to be a weapon that shares the basic physiology of the Metal Demons, which were terminated since they were labeled as extremely violent and dangerous. Rudy's "grandfather", Zepet, gave Rudy a heart and the capacity to care and love, steering him away from being a weapon of mass destruction like his brethren. Rudy is a silent protagonist, though he does have one line in the game.
Cecilia Lynn Adlehyde  (セシリア・レイン・アーデルハイド Seshiria Rein Aderuhaido "Cecilia Raynne Adlehyde"  in the Japanese version) is a young princess who has spent most of her life studying at the Curan Abbey magic school. Her 17th birthday at the beginning of the game marks her official ascension into the Adlehyde royal family and departure from the school. Before she leaves, however, she is contacted by a mysterious voice who beckons her to a hidden library deep within the abbey. There she confronts and defeats a demon using her fledgling magic skills, and frees a powerful entity known as a "Guardian" from a sealed book. The Guardian informs Cecilia that her royal blood allows her to be a medium between the real world and the spirit dimension occupied by the avatars of all the world's elemental forces, and that she will be instrumental in securing the future and reconstruction of the barren planet. Throughout her life she has disliked being just a figurehead. One of her reasons for joining Rudy and Jack was so she would not be lonely.
Jack Van Burace (ザック・ヴァン・ブレイス Zakku Van Bureisu "Zakk Vam Brace" in the Japanese version) is a treasure hunter and swordsman-for-hire who is searching the world for the "ultimate power" that will allow him to confront his troubled past. Upon the discovery of an ancient holographic device within the Memory Temple, Jack learns of the long lost race of the Elw who had developed several forms of advanced technology. He sets off to the town of Adlehyde to find more information that will point him in the direction of his goal. Jack is accompanied by 'Hanpan', a "wind mouse" who speaks and understands the language of humans, and often acts as Jack's moral compass. It is discovered that in his youth he was a Fenril Knight of Arctica, the "Gauntlet-Knight" named Garret Stampede.

Story
A thousand years before the events of Wild Arms, a war raged between the inhabitants of Filgaia and the Metal Demons seeking to turn the planet into their new home. After a fierce struggle, the humans captured the demon's leader, "Mother", and sealed her within a castle in the tundra of Arctica. Unable to destroy her constantly regenerating body, the people of Arctica removed her heart and tore it into three pieces, imprisoned her within a cocoon, and sealed the pieces of her heart inside three stone statues which they spread across the world. With their leader gone, a majority of the demons disappeared, with only a few remaining in seclusion over the next few centuries, eventually launching an attack on the castle to reclaim the incapacitated body of Mother.

Succeeding in their mission, a small band of demon warriors known as the Quarter Knights kept watch over the body of Mother in their fortress protected behind a powerful force field, and began gathering information as to the whereabouts of the guardian statues with the hope of one day reviving her and claiming Filgaia as their own. As time passed, talk of the ancient invasion began to dwindle, though stories of demonic weaponry such as "ARMs" and robotic soldiers still persisted in the minds of many. When a mysterious child named Rudy drifted into the small town of Surf, he came with an ARM at his side. Though he is able to hide it for a time his ARM makes him into a pariah after he is involved with a disastrous earthquake.

Making his way to the city of Adlehyde, Rudy meets Cecilia, a magician-in-training and successor to the Adlehyde royal family, and Jack, a headstrong treasure hunter. The trio team up to help a local engineer named Emma, who is researching ancient technology in a nearby tomb and believes a remnant of the Demon Wars may be inside, but came across the monsters inside the tomb. Upon discovering the object, a deactivated robotic creature called a "golem", the three adventurers escort Emma and their discovery back to Adlehyde to exhibit it at the town's Ruin Festival. During the event, where several other golem creatures are on display, a small army of demons led by Belselk of the Quarter Knights proceed to burn the town, steal the golems, and mortally wound Cecilia's father, the king. In order to spare the remaining people of Adlehyde, Cecilia gives Belselk her family heirloom, a pendant called the Tear Drop that has magical properties which the demons believe can be used as a catalyst for reviving their leader.  When the invaders recall from the town, Rudy and his friends make a pact to stop the Knights from taking control of Filgaia, and to restore balance to the weakening elemental forces of the world that have been in decline since the demons' initial invasion.

Traveling across Filgaia, the heroes make their way to the long-abandoned Guardian Temple to gain the alliance of the mystical guardians who maintain the forces of nature across the planet. There they are tested individually. After each of them fails their personal tests of character, the Guardians reluctantly agree to aid them. The Guardians tell Rudy and his companions that the demons have already begun to revive their leader, and have only to lift the seal on her cocoon-like prison by destroying the three scattered statues that lie across Filgaia. Utilizing ancient Elw technology in the form of teleportation devices, the group travels the world to stop the Quarter Knights from destroying the statues, but they fail in each attempt. The consequent resurrection of Mother occurs, yet the demons are informed by their leader that it is her intention to eradicate Filgaia rather than subjugate it and tells her followers that their own deaths will follow soon after.

Realizing that the only way to defeat the demons is to confront them in their stronghold, the Photosphere, Rudy, Jack, and Cecilia gather the necessary materials to enter the tomb of the last remaining golem, the Earth Golem, Asgard. Convincing him to aid them in their struggle,  Asgard neutralizes the protective seal around the Photosphere, granting Rudy, Jack, and Cecilia access. With the aid of a blue-hooded figure, the heroes are able to re-acquire Cecilia's Tear Drop, previously acting as the power source to the entire fortress, and confront a weakened Mother directly, destroying her body just as the Photosphere sinks into the ocean. Thinking the worst to be over, the trio depart for Adlehyde when they are confronted by the Quarter Knights, who inform them of their plan to take over Filgaia in their maniacal leader's absence, and the blue-hooded character who assisted them was Ziekfried, the leader of the Quarter Knights who betrayed Mother.

The demons attempt to destroy the Ray Line underneath Filgaia. It was the last resort of the Guardians to connect their remaining strength together and maintain the planet. These plans are temporarily thwarted at the last moment, with Zeikfried being thrown through a dimensional rift in space when the three confront him. Finding himself transported to the underwater wreckage of the Photosphere, Zeikfred is met by a deformed visage of Mother, who devours him. However, the remaining Demons find another way to disrupt the Ray line by creating their own tear drop designed to destroy rather than create life and using the Elw teleportation system distribute it all over Filgaia, throwing the forces of nature into chaos. It is also revealed that one of the Quarter Knights was not originally a demon, but Jack's lost love Elmina, which fueled his lust for vengeance.

Later, the demons learn of a giant structure on one of the moons orbiting the planet, Malduke, that was designed to be a space station for residential and military purposes, possessing a powerful weapon that could destroy Filgaia. Inside the demons' newly-arisen tower Ka Dingel that connects with Malduke, Rudy, Jack, and Cecilia confront what remains of their adversaries before reaching the teleportation device to take them to Malduke. Within Malduke's deepest sanctum, they confront Zeikfried, who transforms into a revived Mother. This new being, Motherfried, confronts the heroes with the intent of using Malduke's primary weapon to destroy Filgaia, but is defeated.

Even after defeating the last of the Demons, it seems too late to stop Malduke's weapon from destroying Filgaia, but the Guardians are able to pool their strength and revive the world. Rudy, Jack, and Cecilia board the teleportation device to be transported back to Filgaia, only to be stopped in mid-voyage by what is left of Zeikfried's body and his spear. The weakened Zeikfried launches a last desperate assault on the heroes, and, though defeated in the end, the energy released in the battle destabilizes the portal. Narrowly escaping through the portal to Filgaia, the trio arrives at Ka Dingel just as it collapses, with Asgard arriving to shield them from the falling debris, but the sheer strain causes great damage to the Earth Golem and so, is later allowed to sleep once more beneath the earth with Cecilia's help. With the demons defeated and nature beginning to recover, Jack and Rudy set off on a new journey while Cecilia remains in Adlehyde to fulfill her duties as ruler. In a letter she writes to Jack and Rudy, she tells them that she will send them the item they forgot to help them on their future adventures and shows up shortly after to join them on a new quest.

Development
Wild Arms was developed by Japanese software company Media.Vision and initially released in Japan in late 1996. The studio was founded in 1993 by several members of Telenet Japan who had left the Riot division after having worked on the RPG series Tenshi no Uta for the NEC PC Engine.

Media.Vision had released the "run and gun"-styled shooter game Rapid Reload for the PlayStation a year before Wild Arms. It was developed under the direction of producer Takashi Fukushima and game designer Akifumi Kaneko. Character designer Yoshihiko Ito was responsible for all major character designs.

Wild Arms features an opening sequence by Japanese animation studio Madhouse, with accompanying music by game composer Michiko Naruke titled "Into the Wilderness". The song was arranged by Kazuhiko Toyama and features melancholy whistling by Naoki Takao.

Wild Arms''' soundtrack was composed entirely by Naruke and is heavily inspired by Spaghetti Westerns, featuring instrumentation from mandolins, acoustic and electric guitars, finger cymbals, trumpets, and whistling. A classical theme is also present in many tracks with the melody being provided by string instruments and deep drums to heighten the mood or increase tension. The game's overworld theme "Lone Bird in the Shire", contains the melody from Ennio Morricone's "The Ecstasy of Gold" originally from The Good, the Bad, and the Ugly.

Release
First appearing as a video demo on the promotional PlayStation Jampack vol. 1 in January 1997, the full English version of Wild Arms was made available in March of the same year by Sony Computer Entertainment America (SCEA). Due to the short time frame allotted between the game's completion and its North American release, SCEA assigned seven people to work on the translation, nearly twice as many as their previous RPG translation, Beyond the Beyond. Being released just before the Entertainment Software Rating Board (ESRB) updated their video game ratings system, the game thus received two separate North American ratings: first, "Kids to Adults" (K-A), and later "Everyone" (E) for copies released after January 1, 1998, though both versions contain the same software and catalog number. Wild Arms was later translated to both French and German for its release in the PAL region in late 1998, published by Sony Computer Entertainment's European division. The English versions of Wild Arms changed some of the names (such as Gepetto becoming Zepet, Siegfried becoming Zeikfried, Nergal to Nelgaul, Berserk to Belselk, Belial to Berial, Vambrace becoming Van Burace, Seig Zwei to Zeik Tuvai, and Angolmois becoming Angol Moa). The remake Wild Arms Alter Code: F uses the names from the Japanese version.

The Wild Arms Original Game Soundtrack was initially released in Japan on January 22, 1997, and was re-printed two years later. This version contains only a one-disc sample of the game's music. After the release of the enhanced remake Wild Arms Alter Code: F and its arranged soundtrack, a complete version of the original Wild Arms soundtrack containing all of the game's music, titled Wild Arms Complete Tracks was released on April 6, 2006.

On July 26, 2007, Wild Arms was released on the PlayStation Network in Japan, through which it can be played on the PlayStation Portable and, as of Operating System update 1.70, on the PlayStation 3. On December 6, 2007 this version was released on the North American PlayStation Network. On January 4, 2012, Wild Arms was released on the European PlayStation Store.Wild Arms was included on the PlayStation Classic, a dedicated console built to emulate PlayStation games. The console was released on December 3, 2018.Wild Arms was released on the PlayStation 4 and PlayStation 5 for the upgraded PlayStation Plus service on June 13th, 2022. This release features the ability to rewind the game, as well as video filters and PlayStation Network trophies.

 Reception Wild Arms garnered a positive response. It sold over 250,000 copies in Japan during the first two weeks after its release and was positively reviewed by Japanese critics. Game Informer magazine stated it was "by far one of the best action RPGs of the year", praising the game's use of 3D battle graphics in addition to the colorful 2D graphics of normal gameplay. Their three reviewers scored it 9, 9.25 and 8.5 out of 10. GameFans three reviewers scored it 95%, 92%, and 90%, and also gave it their "Game of the Month" award. They said it "is a spectacular RPG" and, "if not for [Final Fantasy VII], Wild Arms would definitely be RPG of the year so far."Electronic Gaming Monthlys four reviewers scored it 9, 8.5, 9 and 8.5 out of 10, earning it an "Editor's Choice Silver Award", a distinction given to games with a score averaging between 8 and 9 out of 10. Crispin Boyer said it is "easily the best PlayStation RPG to date". They gave it their "Game of the Month" award. Electronic Gaming Monthly gave Wild Arms the Runner-Up award for Role-Playing Game of the Year behind Final Fantasy VII, while GamePro gave Wild Arms the 3rd Place award for Best Role-Playing Game behind Final Fantasy VII and Alundra.

Praise for the game centered on its cutting edge visuals, particularly the detailed polygonal graphics and moving camera of the battle sequences. GamePro added that even the graphics outside of battles were on par with the greatest RPGs, and that the game's graphics alone were "enough to make it one of the season's best titles, no matter what the genre." Next Generation emphasized that "Even with Final Fantasy VII around the corner, Wild Arms still packs a strong visual punch that won't soon be forgotten."

Other commonly applauded aspects of the game included the need to develop all of the player characters and use them individually to solve puzzles and defeat enemies. Boyer deemed this "one of the best party systems in RPG history." Trent Ward commented in GameSpot, "More than just a hack and slash adventure, Wild Arms puts you in several different situations in which you'll run, push and pull rocks, throw switches, and use a swarm of different items. Since all of these options are available to you at all times, the role-playing element never feels constraining."Wild Arms was sometimes designated as a holdover game for Final Fantasy VII, which would be released five months later.

The website RPGFan stated in a retrospective review that it is "very well designed and is a lot of fun to play" and concluded that it "has a great English translation, interesting ideas and makes you use your brain to solve puzzles." The game held an 79% average rating on GameRankings at the time of the site's 2019 closure, pooling reviews from 14 publications.

Legacy

The Wild Arms series has grown to several games since the original title's release, with a fourth sequel released in Japan in December 2006, mobile phone adaptations, a manga, and a Wild Arms anime distributed by ADV Films. In episode three of the anime series Great Teacher Onizuka, Wild Arms (referred in the English voice track as Wild Arms 3) is referenced as a game that the main character Eikichi Onizuka desperately wants to finish; its Japanese box art is also shown on screen.

Remake
 is an enhanced remake of Wild Arms for the PlayStation 2, developed by Media.Vision and published by Sony in Japan and Agetec in North America. The game features entirely new 3D environments, five new playable characters and many other improvements. The game's North American release was postponed several times until it was finally released on November 15, 2005. The North American version comes with a bonus DVD featuring the first episode of the Wild Arms anime series, Wild Arms: Twilight Venom. It was never released in Europe.

The game features more characters than just the original trio. Other characters such as Jane Maxwell, McDullen Harts (called Magdalene Harts in the remake), Emma Hetfield, Mariel, and Zed will be able to join and the player may switch them into the battlefield. All of the dungeons have completely different puzzles and layouts.

The game has been graphically overhauled and now has 3D graphics both in and out of battles. The soundtrack has been heavily remixed or replaced entirely with new music. Numerous FMVs have been added at key points in the game and for the guardian summonings. The encounter cancel system from Wild Arms 2 and 3'', which allows a player to skip a random battle, is present.

Notes

References

External links

  
 Wild Arms at MobyGames

1996 video games
Japanese role-playing video games
Media.Vision games
PlayStation (console) games
PlayStation 2 games
PlayStation Network games
Role-playing video games
Science fantasy video games
Single-player video games
Sony Interactive Entertainment games
Steampunk video games
Video games developed in Japan
Video games featuring female protagonists
Video games scored by Michiko Naruke
Video games set on fictional planets
Video games with 2.5D graphics
Wild Arms video games